The following is a list of the 335 communes of the Ardèche department of France.

The communes cooperate in the following intercommunalities (as of 2020):
Communauté d'agglomération Annonay Rhône Agglo
Communauté d'agglomération Arche Agglo (partly)
Communauté d'agglomération Privas Centre Ardèche
Communauté de communes Ardèche des Sources et Volcans
Communauté de communes Ardèche Rhône Coiron
Communauté de communes du Bassin d'Aubenas
Communauté de communes Berg et Coiron
Communauté de communes Cèze-Cévennes (partly)
Communauté de communes des Gorges de l'Ardèche
Communauté de communes de la Montagne d'Ardèche
Communauté de communes du Pays Beaume-Drobie
Communauté de communes du Pays de Lamastre
Communauté de communes Pays des Vans en Cévennes
Communauté de communes Porte de DrômArdèche (partly)
Communauté de communes Rhône Crussol
Communauté de communes Source de l'Ardèche
Communauté de communes du Val d'Ay
Communauté de communes Val'Eyrieux
Communauté de communes Val de Ligne

References
INSEE Ardèche communes

Ardeche